Young Patriots (in Basque: Gazte Abertzaleak (GA)) is since 1988 the youth wing of the Basque political party Eusko Alkartasuna (EA). Gazte Abertzaleak is a founding member of the EFAY (Youth branch of the European Free Alliance).

Gazte Abertzaleak has an ideology in common with Eusko Alkartasuna, but assuming their own position on several issues due to the political autonomy they enjoy. GA is represented in the executive board of every local organization of EA, in regional organizations and its secretary general is full member of the national executive of the mother party Eusko Alkartasuna.

Their current secretary general is Asier Gomez, elected in November 2016.

Secretaries general 
 1988–1990 – Sabin Arana
 1990–1992 – Fernando Velasco
 1992–1994 – Yon Goikoetxea
 1994–1996 – Jon Ander Arrieta
 1996–1998 – Peio Urizar
 1998–2002 – Martín Arámburu
 2002–2004 – Andoni Iturzaeta
 2004–2007 – Ibon Usandizaga
 2007–2008 – Harkaitz Millan
 2008–2009 – Alain Zamorano
 2009–2012 – Maider Carrere
 2012–2014 – Haritz Perez
 2014–2016 – Ibon Garcia
 2016–2019 – Asier Gomez
 2019–present – Andoni Iriondo

Former members 
Alex Alba
Martin Aranburu
Ikerne Badiola
Mikel Irujo
Onintza Lasa
Maiorga Ramirez
Elisa Sainz de Murieta
Pello Urizar
Fernando Velasco
Maider Carrere
Haritz Perez

References

External links 
  
  

Youth wings of political parties in Spain
Basque nationalism